The New-York Magazine; or, Literary Repository was a monthly literary magazine published in New York City from 1790 to 1797, and claimed as one of the four most important magazines of its time. One of the longest-running magazines of that era (it published almost 100 issues), it focused on theater and travel writing and also essays, poems, and short stories.

The magazine was founded by Thomas and James Swords, who published, printed, and probably edited it. Some of the writers came from "The Friendly Club", a literary society, and included William Dunlap (author of the theater column) and Elihu Hubbard Smith, besides beginning and established authors such as Charles Brockden Brown and Joel Barlow, whose The Hasty-Pudding was published by the magazine in 1796.

Illustrated with costly copperplate engravings, its subscribers included George Washington, John Adams, John Jay, and Richard Varick.

References

External links
Archive (incomplete; duplicates are from different sources):
 Nov 1790, Jan 1791, Index 1793, Oct 1793, Dec 1793, Nov 1794
 1794
 1795
 1795
 1797
 1797

Monthly magazines published in the United States
Defunct literary magazines published in the United States
Magazines established in 1790
Magazines disestablished in 1797
Magazines published in New York City